43 Mechanised Brigade is one of the three combat brigades of the Royal Netherlands Army, the others being the 13th Light Brigade and 11th Airmobile Brigade. The brigade has armored and non-armored vehicles at its disposal, and is tasked with conducting combat operations, peacekeeping and various ceremonial tasks.

On 17 March 2016, the 43rd Mechanised Brigade was integrated into the 1st Panzer Division of the German Army. At the same time, the German 414 Tank Battalion became subordinate to the 43rd Mechanised Brigade. In this battalion one of the four companies is manned by Dutch personnel equipped with 18 German Leopard 2A6 main battle tanks.

The Brigades Headquarters as well as most of the units are located at the Johannes Post Barracks in Havelte, in the province Drenthe.

Organization
The 43 Mechanized Brigade is made up of the following units:

  43 Mechanized Brigade, in Havelte
 43 Staff Company (43 Stafcompagnie), in Havelte
 44 Armoured Infantry Battalion "Johan Willem Friso" (44 Pantserinfanteriebataljon Johan Willem Friso), in Havelte
 Battalion Staff with two CV9035 infantry fighting vehicles
 3x armoured infantry companies with 14 CV9035 each
 Weapons Company
 1x reconnaissance platoon with Fennek light armoured reconnaissance vehicles
 2x anti-tank platoons with Spike anti-tank missiles
 1x mortar platoon with nine 81mm mortars
 45 Armoured Infantry Battalion "Oranje Gelderland" (45 Pantserinfanteriebataljon Oranje Gelderland), in Havelte
 Battalion Staff with two CV9035 infantry fighting vehicles
 3x armoured infantry companies with 14 CV9035 each
 Weapons Company
 1x reconnaissance platoon with Fennek light armoured reconnaissance vehicles
 2x anti-tank platoons with Spike anti-tank missiles
 1x mortar platoon with nine 81mm mortars
 414th Panzer Battalion (GE & NL, 414 Pantserbataljon), in Bergen (Germany)
 1st Staff Company
 2nd; 3rd; 4th (Dutch) and 5th (Reserve) Tank Company, with Leopard 2A6MA2 main battle tanks
 10 National Reserve Corps (NATRES) Battalion (10 Natresbataljon), in Assen
 Alpha Company (Alfacompagnie), in Assen
 Bravo Company (Bravocompagnie), in Assen
 Charlie Company (Charliecompagnie), in Wezep
 Delta Company (Deltacompagnie), in Amersfoort
 Echo Company (Echocompagnie), in Amersfoort
 Foxtrot Company (Foxtrotcompagnie), in Enschede
 11 Armoured Engineer Battalion (11 Pantsergeniebataljon), in Wezep
 Staff Company, 111 and 112 Armored Engineer Company, 101 CBRN Defense Company
 43 Brigade Reconnaissance Squadron "Huzaren van Boreel" (43 Brigadeverkenningseskadron Huzaren van Boreel), in Havelte, with Fennek light armoured reconnaissance vehicles
 43 Medical Company (43 Geneeskundige Compagnie), in Havelte
 43 Maintenance Company (43 Herstelcompagnie), in Havelte

References

Mechanised brigades
Brigades of the Netherlands